Behind the Iron Gate (known in Poland as Za Żelazną Bramą) is a first-person shooter computer game for Amiga computers, released in 1995 by Polish developer Ego. The game is coded by Witold Gantzke. Music is composed by Adam Skorupa, who also created soundtrack for The Witcher.

References

External links
Behind the Iron Gate at Lemon Amiga

Amiga games
Amiga-only games
1995 video games
First-person shooters
Video games developed in Poland